Vox Telecom is a South African Internet service provider, providing FTTH, LTE, voice and Satlite Internet services to the South African consumers.

Vox began as @tlatic Telecom and traded locally since 1996 and grew into one of the largest independent service providers in South Africa with a customer base of over 120 000 subscribers.

History 
@lantic was founded in January 1996 by Neels Fourie.

In 2005, @tlantic acquired by Vox Telecom.

In 2012, @tlantic collapsed into the Vox Telecom Group.

In 2022, Vox changed its name to Vivica Group.

Social investment 
In partnership with local South African communities, @lantic hosts a sevens rugby series for schools. It is aimed at the development of the youth through sport and with this sport receiving Olympic status from 2016, it acts as a formal pathway for schoolboys to progress to the South African national sevens rugby team. The series offers the opportunity for small rural schools to compete against large urban schools, which is not possible in other competitions.

References

External links 
 

Telecommunications companies of South Africa
Companies based in the City of Tshwane
Internet service providers of South Africa
Telecommunications companies established in 1996
South African companies established in 1996
Organisations based in Pretoria